Ildikó Illyés (born August 28, 1966 in Békés) is a retired female race walker from Hungary, who competed for her native country at the 1992 Summer Olympics in Barcelona, Spain. She set her personal best (43.57) in the women's 10 km event in 1996.

Achievements

References

External links
 
 
 
 
 

1966 births
Living people
Hungarian female racewalkers
Athletes (track and field) at the 1992 Summer Olympics
Olympic athletes of Hungary
People from Békés
Sportspeople from Békés County